Drôle de jeu is a prize winning 1945 French novel by Roger Vailland first published by Éditions Corrêa. The work explores the ironies of the French Resistance. It was published in English in a translation by Gerard Hopkins as Playing with Fire by Chatto & Windus in 1948. Although Vailland later tried to play down the autobiographical elements in the novel, these have been documented by his biographers.

References

1945 French novels
Novels set during World War II
Novels set in France